Frederick Ponsonby may refer to:

 Frederick Ponsonby, 3rd Earl of Bessborough (1758–1844), Anglo-Irish peer
 Frederick Ponsonby (1775-1849), MP for Galway Borough 1811–1813
 Frederick Cavendish Ponsonby (1783–1837), British military officer, second son of the 3rd Earl of Bessborough
 Frederick Ponsonby, 6th Earl of Bessborough (1815–1895), English peer and cricketer
 Frederick Ponsonby, 1st Baron Sysonby (1867–1935), British soldier and courtier
 Frederick Ponsonby, 10th Earl of Bessborough (1913–1993), British diplomat, businessman, playwright, politician, and peer
 Frederick Ponsonby, 4th Baron Ponsonby of Shulbrede (born 1958), British peer and Labour Party politician